Anthony Joshua vs Dillian Whyte, billed as Bad Intentions, was a heavyweight professional boxing match contested between undefeated Commonwealth and World Boxing Council (WBC) International champion Anthony Joshua, and undefeated WBC International Silver champion Dillian Whyte, with Joshua's Commonwealth and WBC International, and the vacant British titles on the line. The bout took place on 12 December 2015 at The O2 Arena in London, England. Joshua defeated Whyte, adding the British title to his Commonwealth and WBC International titles title via seventh-round technical knockout (TKO).

Background
Joshua and Whyte first fought in 2009 as amateurs, with Whyte knocking Joshua down en route to a points decision victory. While Joshua stayed in the amateurs to win a gold medal at the 2012 Olympics, Whyte turned professional in 2011, going on to compile a record of 9–0 (6 KOs) before receiving a two-year ban after failing a drug test in 2012 for the banned substance methylhexaneamine. After the ban ended in 2014, Whyte expressed his desire for a rematch with Joshua, now 9–0 (9 KOs), while also claiming there was animosity between the two after Joshua made disparaging comments towards Whyte in an interview. On 9 July 2015, the British Boxing Board of Control announced an agreement had been reached between the two to fight for the vacant British heavyweight title. Following Joshua's win over Gary Cornish in September, a first-round TKO to capture the vacant Commonwealth title, promoter Eddie Hearn revealed during the post-fight interview that the bout would take place on 12 December at The O2 Arena in London.

The Fight

The opener was an action-packed round which saw both fighters throwing power punches throughout, with the highlight being a left hook from Joshua that wobbled Whyte. Chaos erupted in the ring after Joshua threw a punch after the bell sounded to end the round, prompting Whyte to throw two punches over the shoulder of referee Howard Foster. Cornermen from both sides entered the ring to separate both fighters. At the start of the second round, Foster immediately called a timeout, bringing the fighters together and giving both a warning for their actions in the previous round before resuming the contest. Joshua began to goad Whyte, talking to him before throwing punches. With a little over one minute left of the round, Whyte landed a solid left hook that staggered Joshua. Whyte followed up with a barrage of punches but was unable to drop the champion. The third round saw both men work behind the jab, each landing stiff left hands. The bell sounding to start the fourth marked the first time Joshua had been past three rounds. He began to find his target with more frequency, leaving Whyte on unsteady legs on more than one occasion. The fifth and sixth rounds saw much of the same, both men having success with Joshua landing the more eye catching punches. The end came on the seventh, a round which both fighters had never previously fought in. Less than a minute into the round, Joshua landed a right hand to the head of Whyte, staggering the challenger and sending him reeling backwards into the ropes. After a sustained follow up attack by the champion, a right uppercut landed on the chin of Whyte, dropping the challenger and leaving him laid on his back and prompting Foster to forgo the ten count and wave off the contest.

Fight card

See also
List of British heavyweight boxing champions
List of Commonwealth boxing champions

References

2015 in boxing
2015 in British sport
December 2015 sports events in the United Kingdom
2015 sports events in London
Pay-per-view boxing matches
Boxing matches involving Anthony Joshua